Edwin C. "Ned" Holstein is an American physician and children's rights advocate. He is a founder and chairman of the National Parents Organization, and an advocate for shared parenting as being in the best interest of most children after separation or divorce.

Education and medical career
Holstein holds a bachelor's degree from Harvard College, a master's degree in psychology from the Massachusetts Institute of Technology and an M.D. degree from Mount Sinai School of Medicine (1971). He did his residency in internal medicine at Boston City Hospital and a fellowship in preventive medicine at Mt Sinai School of Medicine from 1976 to 1978.

Holstein is board certified in internal medicine, preventive medicine and occupational medicine. He practices occupational medicine in Newton, Massachusetts. In addition to his clinical work, he has conducted environmental health research, studying e.g. the carcinogenic effects of asbestos,  public health responses to asbestos exposure, liver function among dairy farmers, and techniques for measuring polybrominated biphenyl exposure.

Organizational service
In 1998, Holstein founded the National Parents Organization, an organization that promotes shared parenting after separation or divorce   He is the chairman of the board and he has at times also served as the national executive director.

He also serves on the board of directors for the International Council on Shared Parenting. In May 2017, he organized and hosted the Third International Conference on Shared Parenting in Boston.

Shared parenting advocacy
Holstein bases his advocacy for shared parenting on scientific studies from around the world. This research has shown that children with a shared parenting arrangement perform better on a variety of physical health, mental health and social relationship metrics, compared to children in sole custody.

Media coverage
Holstein has been interviewed and quoted by various media outlets, including:
 Marilyn Gardner, When equal custody is law, who gains?, Christian Science Monitor, June 24, 2004.
 Susanna Schrobsdorff, Divorce: The New Rules of Child Custody, Newsweek, December 14, 2008. 
 Jennifer Ludden, Push To Change Custody Laws: What's Best For Kids?, Morning Edition, National Public Radio, February 26, 2014.
 Mandy Oaklander, This Divorce Arrangement Stresses Kids Out Most, Time Magazine, April 27, 2015.
 Dugan Arnett, In Massachusetts and elsewhere, a push for custody reform, Boston Globe, August 1, 2015.
 Gail Rosenblum, New research supports shared custody for children in divorce, Minnesota Star Tribune, September 3, 2017.
 Jayne O'Donnell, Sierra Lewter, Fatherlessness is harder on Father's Day, but 'father figures,' other role models fill in, USA Today, June 15, 2018.
s of children of divorce, Maryland Reporter, January 18, 2018.

See also
Joint custody (United States)
Shared parenting

References

External links 
 National Parents Organization
 International Council on Shared Parenting
 Video interview by Llewellyn King: Shared parenting after divorce, Dr. Ned Holstein, White House Chronicle, November 16, 2018.

Living people
Children's rights activists
American human rights activists
Physicians from Massachusetts
American occupational health practitioners
People from Newton, Massachusetts
MIT School of Humanities, Arts, and Social Sciences alumni
Harvard College alumni
Year of birth missing (living people)